Aljoša Matko (born 29 March 2000) is a Slovenian footballer who plays as a forward for Slovenian PrvaLiga club Celje.

Early life
Matko was born in Novo Mesto and grew up in Črnomelj. He began his career at the age of four with local club Bela Krajina, where he stayed for eight years. In 2013 he moved to Krka, before joining the youth academy of domestic giants Maribor in 2015. He went on to score 67 goals in 93 games in the club's youth system.

Club career

Maribor
In 2019–20, Matko was sent on loan from Maribor to fellow PrvaLiga club Bravo, where he made his debut in senior football. Matko scored 15 goals in 34 games for Bravo, that finished sixth in the table, which meant that he became the fourth best goalscorer in the whole league.

Back at Maribor for the 2020–21 season, Matko established himself as a starter under manager Mauro Camoranesi. At the end of 2020, he won the Purple Warrior, a trophy awarded to the most distinguished Maribor player in the past year. He was also named Slovenian Youth Footballer of the Year by the Slovenian magazine EkipaSN. On 29 January 2021, Matko extended his contract with Maribor until the summer of 2024. In April of the same year, Matko was involved in a car accident as a driver but escaped uninjured, although several passengers suffered from severe injuries. He soon returned to the pitch and ended the season making 29 league appearances, scoring seven goals, as Maribor finished second in the table behind Mura.

Hammarby IF
On 12 August 2021, Matko transferred to Hammarby IF in the Swedish Allsvenskan for an undisclosed fee, signing a three-year contract. He made his competitive debut for the club only four days later, on 16 August, in a 2–0 home loss to IF Elfsborg. On 22 August, he scored his first Allsvenskan goal for the club, against the same opponent, IF Elfsborg, in a 2–2 away draw.

On 1 February 2022, Matko returned to Slovenia by joining Olimpija Ljubljana on loan for the remainder of the PrvaLiga season, with an option to make the transfer permanent. He returned to Hammarby in July 2022, but failed to make any competitive appearances under new head coach Martí Cifuentes. In total, Matko played 13 Allsvenskan games for the club, scoring twice.

Celje
On 15 August 2022, Matko transferred to PrvaLiga club Celje and signed a two-year contract until 2024.

International career
Between 2015 and 2022, Matko was capped for all Slovenian youth teams from under-16 to under-21, making over 60 appearances for all selections.

With the under-21 team, Matko appeared at the 2021 UEFA European Under-21 Championship, hosted by Slovenia. He featured in all three games in the group stage and scored Slovenia's only goal of the tournament in a 1–1 draw against Czech Republic.

Career statistics

Club

Honours

Club
Maribor
Slovenian PrvaLiga: 2018–19

Individual
Slovenian Youth Footballer of the Year: 2020
Maribor Player of the Year: 2020

References

External links
Aljoša Matko at NZS 

2000 births
Living people
Sportspeople from Novo Mesto
Slovenian footballers
Association football forwards
Association football wingers
NK Maribor players
NK Bravo players
Hammarby Fotboll players
NK Olimpija Ljubljana (2005) players
NK Celje players
Slovenian PrvaLiga players
Allsvenskan players
Slovenia youth international footballers
Slovenia under-21 international footballers
Slovenian expatriate footballers
Slovenian expatriate sportspeople in Sweden
Expatriate footballers in Sweden